Motoki (written: 元気, 昌樹, 誠記, 基輝, or モトキ in katakana) is a masculine Japanese given name. Notable people with the name include:

Motoki Imagawa (born 1980), Japanese footballer
, Japanese footballer
, Japanese judoka
, Japanese actor
, Japanese voice actor and singer
, Japanese academic and linguist

Motoki (written: 本木, 元木 or 端木) is also a Japanese surname. Notable people with the surname include:

, Japanese film director and producer
, Japanese actor
, Chinese businessman
, Japanese actor
, Japanese sport wrestler
, Japanese rugby union player

Japanese-language surnames
Japanese masculine given names